Alexandra Elizabeth Sheedy (born June 13, 1962) is an American actress. Following her film debut in 1983's Bad Boys, she became known as one of the Brat Pack group of actors and starred in WarGames (1983), The Breakfast Club (1985) and Short Circuit (1986). For her performance in Lisa Cholodenko's High Art (1998), Sheedy won the Independent Spirit Award for Best Female Lead.

Early life
Alexandra Elizabeth Sheedy was born in New York City on June 13, 1962, and has two siblings, brother Patrick and sister Meghan. Her mother, Charlotte (née Baum), is a writer and press agent who was involved in women's and civil rights movements, and her father, John J. Sheedy Jr., is a Manhattan advertising executive. Sheedy's mother is Eastern European Jewish, whereas her father is of Irish Catholic background. Her maternal grandmother was from Odessa, Ukraine. Her parents divorced in 1971.

She attended the Bank Street School for Children, followed by Columbia Grammar & Preparatory School in New York City, graduating in 1980. She started dancing with the American Ballet Theatre at age six and was planning to make it a full-time career. She gave up dance in favor of acting full time, however, and then started studying acting with acting teacher Harold Guskin. At age 12 she wrote a book, She Was Nice to Mice. The book was published by McGraw-Hill Education and became a best-seller. On June 19, 1975, she appeared on the game show To Tell the Truth.

At age 18, Sheedy relocated to Los Angeles, California, where she enrolled in the drama department at the University of Southern California. Sheedy concurrently began her acting career and intermittently completed three years' worth of courses toward a BFA degree in acting.

Career

Sheedy started acting in local stage productions as a teenager. After appearing in several television films in 1981, as well as three episodes of the television series Hill Street Blues, she made her feature film debut in Bad Boys (1983), starring Sean Penn, wherein she played Penn's humiliated girlfriend. The 1980s were her most active period, with roles in popular films such as WarGames, The Breakfast Club, St. Elmo's Fire, Short Circuit, and Maid to Order.

Sheedy starred alongside Radha Mitchell in the 1998 independent film High Art, about a romance between two women and the power of art. Her performance in High Art was recognized with awards from the Independent Spirit Awards, Los Angeles Film Critics Association, and National Society of Film Critics.

In 1999, Sheedy took over the lead role in the off-Broadway production of the musical Hedwig and the Angry Inch. She was the first cis-gender female to play the part of the genderqueer Hedwig, but her run ended early amid "mixed" reviews, according to E! News. That same year, she was cast as a lead actress in Sugar Town, an independent film that featured an ensemble cast of actors and musicians.

She was reunited with Breakfast Club co-star Anthony Michael Hall when she became a special guest star on his television show The Dead Zone, in the second-season episode "Playing God", from 2003.

Sheedy has also appeared in the episode "Leapin' Lizards" of C.S.I., in which she played a woman who murdered her boyfriend's wife while mixed up in a cult. On March 3, 2008, Sheedy was introduced as the character Sarah in the ABC Family show Kyle XY. In 2009, she played the role of Mr. Yang on the USA Network television show Psych (in the third-season finale), a role that she reprised in the fourth season, fifth season, and seventh season finales.

Personal life

Sheedy became a vegetarian at the age of 12.

Sheedy dated Bon Jovi guitarist Richie Sambora for less than a year in the 1980s. She stated in Los Angeles Times that the relationship led her to abuse drugs, a claim Sambora denied. In 1985, Sheedy was admitted to Hazelden Foundation and in the 1990s was treated for a sleeping pill addiction, an experience she drew on for her role as a drug-addicted photographer in High Art.

On April 12, 1992, Sheedy married actor David Lansbury, the nephew of actress Angela Lansbury and son of Edgar Lansbury, the original producer of Godspell. They have a son, Beckett, born in 1994. Beckett is a trans man from whose transition Sheedy says she "learned a lot". In 2008, Sheedy announced that she and Lansbury had filed for divorce.

In January 2018, Sheedy tweeted the #MeToo hashtag along with the names of James Franco and Christian Slater, implying that they have been sexually abusive to her, but later deleted the tweets. Franco later stated that he did not know why Sheedy tweeted the accusations.

Filmography

Film

Television

Awards and nominations

Books
 She Was Nice to Mice, McGraw-Hill, 1975, 
 Yesterday I Saw the Sun: Poems, Summit Books, 1991,

References

External links
 
 
 
 
 Salon interview (June 25, 1998)
 New York magazine interview (June 15, 1998)
 Breakfast Club cast interview at the Chicago Tribune (February 17, 1985)
"The Poetry of Ally Sheedy: A Look Back" (February 24, 2012)

1962 births
20th-century American actresses
20th-century American writers
20th-century American women writers
21st-century American actresses
Actresses from New York City
American female dancers
Dancers from New York (state)
American film actresses
American people of Irish descent
American people of Ukrainian-Jewish descent
American stage actresses
American television actresses
Columbia Grammar & Preparatory School alumni
Independent Spirit Award for Best Female Lead winners
Jewish American actresses
Living people
People from Fire Island, New York
USC School of Dramatic Arts alumni
21st-century American Jews